The Man on Horseback is a 1943 novel by the French writer Pierre Drieu la Rochelle. It is set in Bolivia and tells the story of a dictator who tries to create an empire. The novel explores the author's ideas about political momentum and its origins. The allegorical narrative, complex plot and romantic verve make the novel stand out from Drieu's previous works, which are written in a realistic style and largely autobiographical.

Publication
The first edition of The Man on Horseback was published in March 1943 and the second in July the same year. An English translation by Thomas M. Hines was published in 1978.

See also
 Dictator novel

References

External links
 Publicity page at Éditions Gallimard's website 

1943 French novels
Dictator novels
French-language novels
Novels by Pierre Drieu La Rochelle
Novels set in Bolivia
Éditions Gallimard books